Scott James Ward (born 5 October 1981) in the London Borough of Brent, is an English former professional footballer who played as a goalkeeper for Luton Town in the Football League.  Ward signed professional terms for Luton Town on his 17th birthday and while making his first team debut saved a penalty with his first touch in League football against Brentford.  He had several periods in and out of the professional game, which involved a time at Plymouth Argyle.

He is the brother of professional footballers Darren and Elliott Ward.

References

External links

1981 births
Living people
Footballers from the London Borough of Brent
English footballers
Association football goalkeepers
Luton Town F.C. players
Boreham Wood F.C. players
Chesham United F.C. players
Grays Athletic F.C. players
Dulwich Hamlet F.C. players
Margate F.C. players
Crawley Town F.C. players
Lewes F.C. players
London Colney F.C. players
English Football League players
National League (English football) players
Isthmian League players